The parachuting tournaments in air sports at the 2001 World Games in Akita was played between 17 and 19 August. 64 parachuters, from 14 nations, participated in the tournament. The parachuting competition took place at Ogata Athletic Field.

Participating nations

Medal table

Events

References

External links
 Fédération Aéronautique Internationale
 Air sports on IWGA website
 Results

 
2001 World Games
2001
Ōgata, Akita